Amy Joan Irene Sayer (born 30 November 2001) is an Australian soccer player at Stanford Cardinal. She primarily plays as an attacking midfielder but was also deployed as a defensive midfielder in the under-20s national team. She is known for her vision, passing, all round technical ability, and her ability to play and score with both feet.

On 16 July 2018, Sayer received her first call up to the Matildas, the senior Australian Women's Team, for the 2018 Tournament of Nations.

Early life and education 
Born in Sydney, Australia, Sayer grew up in Northern Sydney, where attended Ravenswood School for Girls and later Barker College. She was granted special permission to not attend classes due to her international team commitments and playing for Canberra United during the W-League season.

Club career

Junior career
Sayer began her youth career at Northbridge FC (now known as North Shore Mariners), as well as playing futsal and football at the FNSW Institute.

Several clubs were interested in signing Sayer for the 2016 W-League season, however due to her age, she decided to stay closer to home, signing for Sydney University on a youth contract.

Canberra United
Canberra United signed several young talents to play in the 2017 W-League season. Sayer joined the club after some impressive performances for the Australian National U-20 Women's Team, along with teammates Georgia Plessas, Georgia Boric, Clare Hunt, and Karly Roestbakken.

On 25 November, Amy Sayer scored her first goal in the country's top division in a 3–2 home win against Perth Glory at McKellar Park. Sayer finished the season with one goal in 10 appearances, as well as being deployed in various positions such as an attacking midfielder and a left winger by manager Heather Garriock.

Sydney FC
Sayer signed for Sydney FC on 4 September 2018 after one season at Canberra United in the W-League. On 3 November, she scored her maiden goal for her new club in her first appearance.

On 9 November 2018, Sayer was diagnosed with a stress fracture in her right foot. She was withdrawn from the Australia squad for the Seven Consulting Series against Chile, and was ruled out for at least 12 weeks. Her next appearance in a football match will be in January 2019, at the earliest.

College career 
In January 2020, Sayer was accepted to Stanford University, and joined them at the conclusion of the 2019–20 W-League, playing for Stanford Cardinal.

2020 
During the 2020 season (which was played during the spring of 2021), Sayer quickly stood out, starting in 9 of her 10 appearances for the team. In these appearances, Sayer racked up a total of 679 minutes of action, playing more than 50 minutes in 8 matches. Throughout the season, Sayer primarily played in the midfield, utilizing her vision to move the ball quickly and maintain possession. This style of play led to Sayer capturing one assist on the season and earning the honor of being on the 2020 PAC-12 All-Freshman team. Her performances garnered the attention of the Matildas once again, leading to a call up to play with the squad in two international friendlies against Germany and The Netherlands. These friendlies would take place in The Netherlands, causing Sayer to miss the middle portion of the Stanford season due to international duty.

2021 
With little time between the end of the 2020 season and the beginning of the 2021 season, Sayer picked up where she left off, making 19 appearances and starting in 7 games for the Cardinal with the majority of her minutes coming at the forward position. Adapting to the new position, Sayer excelled, nabbing 2 assists as well as 2 goals, her first for the team. Her goals came in back-to-back games with the second coming against in a 3–1 victory against the 2020 Champions the Santa Clara Broncos. Sayer's performances helped the Cardinal to a 13-6-1 record and an invitation to the NCAA Division I Women's Soccer Championship, in which they unfortunately lost in the first round.

2022 
Heading into the 2022 season, Sayer looked to build on her success as a forward from the previous year. She did just that, being a starter in 5 of the first 6 games of the season, nabbing 3 goals during this span. Two of these goals came in a 5-1 thrashing of the UC Santa Barbara Gauchos after Sayer came on as a substitute in the 17th minute. Throughout the remainder of the season, Sayer split playing time amongst her other teammates, appearing in 19 matches in total, primarily coming in as a substitute. Sayer finished the season accumulating a total of 548 minutes, her lowest amount in her three seasons with the Stanford Cardinal women's soccer team despite improving in almost every major statistical category (goals, assists, shot percentage, shots on goal, shot accuracy, and game-winning goals). By the season's end, Sayer ended with a total of 4 goals, 2 assists, and a shot on goal percentage of 51.6%. This would help lead the Cardinal to a 17-2-2 regular season record and earn the team the honour of outright Pac-12 Champions and an automatic berth to the NCAA Division I Women's Soccer Championship as a 3-seed in the tournament. After their title-clinching 1–1 draw against the University of California, Berkeley, Sayer would be called up to the Australia women's national soccer team, and miss the first round of the NCAA Division I Women's Soccer Championship. She would return immediately afterwards to play in the second round against the BYU Cougars women's soccer team, in which the Cardinal would fall 5–4 on PK's.

International career

Debut and First Appearances 
Sayer made her international youth debut on 25 August 2016, in a 28–0 demolition of Palestine, played at Vietnam. She marked her debut with one goal and seven assists in the first half of the match. She followed the first cap with three more dominating displays against Hong Kong (14–0), Iraq (8–0) and Vietnam (6–0).

At the age of 14 years old, Sayer earned her first call up to the U-20 squad for the AFC Pre-qualifiers in November 2016. She made two appearances in two games, playing full minutes and scoring two goals. Following her debut tournament, Sayer was reselected in the Young Matilda's squad for the friendly series against USA and Canada in July 2017, and for the 2017 AFC Qualification Tournament held in China where she made four more appearances in the group stage and final series. She made another appearance in the 2018 friendly match against Thailand where she scored one goal.

On 16 July 2018, Alen Stajcic called up Sayer to the senior Matildas squad to participate in the Tournament of Nations in the United States after impressing in her maiden W-League season in with 10 appearances. She earned her first international cap as a 93rd-minute substitute in the 2018 Tournament of Nations against Japan.

Sayer was called up to the Matildas squad for the second time to play matches against France and England in October 2018. She came on as a substitute against France but couldn't salvage a 2–0 defeat, while she started the second match against England in a 1–1 draw following a last minute header from Clare Polkinghorne.

Later in October, Sayer joined the Young Matildas on their trip to Lebanon, to play Mongolia, Lebanon and Hong Kong. She scored a hat-trick in the 18-0 demolition of Mongolia, while an assist and a goal against Lebanon, and one assist with a brace against Hong Kong, converting the first from the penalty spot, and the second from outside the box.

On 9 November 2018, Sayer withdrew from the Matildas squad in the two-match series against Chile after a stress fracture diagnosis.

2021 
During April 2021, Sayer made her way back onto the Matildas squad to participate in two friendlies against Germany and The Netherlands. These would be the first matches played by the Matildas since the beginning of the COVID-19 pandemic, giving greater significance to the matches. In the match against Germany on 10 April 2021, Sayer would be substituted on in the 57th minute, marking her fourth ever appearance for the squad. She would play 33 minutes at the attacking midfield position as the match would play out to a 5–2 score line in favor of Germany.

2022 
In June 2022, Sayer would be called back up to the Matildas for a two-match away series of friendlies against Spain and Portugal. During their first match against Spain, Sayer made her 5th appearance with the squad after being substituted on in 67th minute. Despite the match resulting a 7–0 loss for the Matildas, Sayer did manage to get off 1 shot during her time on the pitch. In the following match against Portugal, Sayer made her 6th appearance with the Matildas coming on as a substitute in the 84th minute of the 1–1 draw.

Immediately following her campaign with the Matildas, Sayer was called up to the Australia women's national under-23 soccer team squad to participate in the 2022 AFF Women's Championship. Sayer appeared in 3 matches for the squad, scoring 5 goals throughout the duration of the tournament, 4 of which came in a 4-0 thrashing of Thailand. Sayer scored her first 3 goals within the first 15 minutes of play before adding a 4th in the 44th minute. Despite the team not securing enough points to advance out of the group stage of the tournament, Sayer's goalscoring was enough to nab her a shared title of 3rd highest goal scorer in the tournament.

Following her impressive performance in the 2022 AFF Women's Championship, Sayer was once again promoted to the Matildas for a series of home friendlies against Sweden and Thailand in November 2022. The team would go on to win both games fixtures with a score line of 4–0 against Sweden, and a score line of 2–0 against Thailand.

Style of Play 
An attacking midfielder and playmaker, Sayer is adept at finding quality forward passes and likes to combine with others for quick passing moves rather than carrying the ball too often. While Sayer is an excellent athlete, her style draws more on her technical range, vision and creativity and she would prefer to play an incisive pass or use one touch passing combinations to beat a player – rather than looking to rely on speed in a footrace.
In the front third she is an increasingly unpredictable and dangerous attacker as she adds more variety to her attacking style – while she is naturally inclined to look for a clever through pass or combination play to attack the opponent's penalty box, she is equally capable of scoring from range on either foot and is demonstrating this more and more with some eye-catching long-distance goals at club and international level.

Honours

Club
 W-League Championship: 2018–19

Collegiate 
Pac-12 Conference All-Freshman Team: 2020
Pac-12 Conference Fall Academic Honor Roll: 2021
Pac-12 Conference Champion: 2022

References

"Youngster enjoying dream run with Junior Matildas". Matildas. Retrieved 2018-03-28
"United bolstered by Young Matildas contingent". Canberra United. Retrieved 2018-03-28.
"Amy Sayer". Canberra United. Retrieved 2018-03-28
 "Canberra United Women vs Perth Glory Women, Westfield W-League, Round 5, 25th Nov 2017". Canberra United. Retrieved 2018-03-28
"Amy Sayer – Player Statistics". SportsTG. Retrieved 2018-03-28

2001 births
Living people
Canberra United FC players
Sydney FC (A-League Women) players
Stanford Cardinal women's soccer players
Women's association football midfielders
Australian women's soccer players
A-League Women players
Australia women's international soccer players
Soccer players from Sydney
Sportswomen from New South Wales
Expatriate women's soccer players in the United States
Australian expatriate sportspeople in the United States
Australian expatriate women's soccer players
People educated at Barker College